Haruyo (written: 春代 or 春世) is a feminine Japanese given name. Notable people with the name include:

, Japanese artist 
, Japanese actress and singer
, Japanese volleyball player

Japanese feminine given names